Boris "Boro" Bračulj (4 August 1939 – 26 July 2019) was a Bosnian Croat former professional football player and football manager who was originally from Croatia.

Playing career

Club
Bračulj started playing youth football in his hometown's Junak Sinj in 1954. A year later, he moved to Sarajevo suburb Ilidža and began playing for Igman. He played for the youth squad until he became a part of the first team in 1957.

He also played for Čelik Zenica before moving to Željezničar in 1963. He played in 97 league matches for the club, scoring 18 goals. Bračulj retired from active football in 1969.

International
While playing for Čelik Zenica, in 1962 Bračulj was called up to the Yugoslavia Olympic football team for the 1964 Summer Olympics.

Managerial career
After finishing his playing career, Bračulj stayed in football as a manager. He is considered to be one of the best Bosnian football fitness coaches. He worked in the Željezničar youth squads, and then as a manager of Jedinstvo Bihać, Iskra Bugojno and Leotar. In 1978, he became an assistant manager to Ivica Osim in Željezničar. Bračulj was also Željezničar manager on two occasions, the first occasion being from 1986 to 1987, and second one being from 1997 to 1998.

During a period in the 1988–89 season, he held the caretaker manager role at Željezničar alongside Mišo Smajlović. His last managerial position was that of Olimpik manager from 2000 to 2001.

Death
Bračulj died at the age of 79 on 26 July 2019 in Sarajevo, Bosnia and Herzegovina.

References

External links
FK Željezničar Sarajevo all-stars at pesmitidelcalcio.com

1939 births
2019 deaths
People from Sinj
Croats of Bosnia and Herzegovina
Association football forwards
Yugoslav footballers
NK Čelik Zenica players
FK Željezničar Sarajevo players
Yugoslav First League players
Yugoslav football managers
Bosnia and Herzegovina football managers
NK Jedinstvo Bihać managers
NK Iskra Bugojno managers
FK Željezničar Sarajevo managers
FK Leotar managers
FK Olimpik managers
Yugoslav First League managers
Premier League of Bosnia and Herzegovina managers